Venpa or Venba (வெண்பா in Tamil) is a form of classical Tamil poetry. Classical Tamil poetry has been classified based upon the rules of metric prosody. Such rules form a context-free grammar. Every venba consists of between two and twelve lines. The venpa meter is used in songs of the types neṭu veṇ pāṭṭu ('long song in venpa meter'), kuṟu veṇ pāṭṭu 'short song in venpa meter', kaikkiḷai "one-sided love," and paripāṭṭu 'song that is quite accommodative' and in satirical compositions (aṅkatac ceyyuḷ).

Popular books written in venba style 
 All 1330 couplets from the Thirukkural, composed by Thiruvalluvar, are examples of venba. Tirukkural comes under a sub-category of venba called Kural venba, wherein each kural or couplet has only two lines.
 Nala venba1 is another classical work written in venba style.
 Niti venba2 is another venba style book that preaches values.
 Acharakkovai3 is another venba style book that preaches values

Basic elements of meter in classical Tamil poetry 
Vowels and consonant-vowel compounds in Tamil alphabet have been classified into ones with short sounds (kuril) and the ones with long sounds (nedil). A sequence of one or more of these units optionally followed by a consonant can form a ner asai (the Tamil word asai roughly corresponds to syllable) or a nirai asai depending on the duration of pronunciation. Ner and Nirai are the basic units of meter in Tamil prosody. A siir or cheer is a type of metrical foot that roughly corresponds to an iamb. Thalai is the juxtaposition of iambic patterns.

Note that the official terms for the different "asai"s are self-descriptive. For example, the word "ner" is itself classified as ner asai. And the word "nirai" is a nirai asai.

Grammar for meter in Venba 
A set of well defined metric rules define the grammar for venba. Such rules have been proved to form a context-free grammar.

One set of rules constrains the duration of sound for each word or cheer, while another set of rules defines the rules for the possible sounds at the beginning of a word that follows a given sound at the end of the preceding word. Any venba should conform to both these sets of rules.

Following is the set of production rules corresponding to the first set of rules.

Following is the set of production rules corresponding to the second set of rules.

Example 
Following is a couplet from Tirukkural:

Notes

References

External links 
 Nala Venba (pdf version)
 Niti Venba (TSCII encoding)
 யாப்புலகம் 
 வெண்பா விதிகள்
 வெண்பாவின் ஈற்றடி
 Context Free Grammar for Natural Language Constructs. An implementation for venba Class of Tamil Poetry (2003, conference paper)  

Tamil poetics
fr:Tirukkuṛaḷ